Katsuo (written: , ,  or ) is a masculine Japanese given name. Notable people with the name include:

, Japanese basketball player
, Japanese boxer
, Japanese boxer
, Japanese footballer
, Japanese sumo wrestler
, Japanese actor
, Japanese long-distance runner
, Japanese long-distance runner and politician
, Japanese baseball player
, Japanese swimmer
, Japanese boxer
, Japanese sumo wrestler
Cleyton Katsuo (クレイトンカツオ, born 1988), Brazilian woodworker and developer

Fictional characters
, a character in the manga series Sazae-san

See also
Katsuo, Japanese name for Skipjack tuna and occasionally its substitute bonito
Katsuō-ji, a Buddhist temple in Osaka Prefecture, Japan

Japanese masculine given names